Javier Sánchez and Éric Winogradsky were the defending champions, but lost in the quarterfinals to Pablo Arraya and Dimitri Poliakov.

Tomás Carbonell and Francisco Roig won the title by defeating Arraya and Poliakov 6–7, 6–2, 6–4 in the final.

Seeds
All seeds received a bye to the second round.

Draw

Finals

Top half

Bottom half

References

External links
 Official results archive (ATP)
 Official results archive (ITF)

Doubles
Austrian Open Kitzbühel